Kosovo is a rural locality (a village) in Nozemsky Selsoviet of Mezhdurechensky District in Vologda Oblast, Russia.

References

Rural localities in Mezhdurechensky District, Vologda Oblast